Lung Leg (born Elisabeth Carr; July 8, 1963, in Minneapolis, Minnesota) is an American pin-up girl and actress perhaps best known for appearing on the cover of the Sonic Youth album EVOL. During the 1980s, she gained fame as a model and star of films made by the transgressive movement.

Film career 
Lung Leg appeared in several Richard Kern films, notably starring in one of his longest features, the 1985 film You Killed Me First, as well as appearing in Worm Movie (1985) and Fingered (1986). She also appeared in two music videos directed by Kern, "Concubine" (1984) by Butthole Surfers and Sonic Youth song "Death Valley '69" (1985).

After her film career in the 1980s, Lung Leg left the public sphere for several years. Nick Zedd wrote in his autobiography, Totem of the Depraved, that she relocated to Minneapolis, before moving back to New York City after a short romance with German musician Blixa Bargeld of Einstürzende Neubauten and Nick Cave and the Bad Seeds.

She resumed her film career in 2005, appearing in the Mike Etoll film Sewer Baby. In it, she played a bartender dealing with Tiny Tim, various monsters, special effects and a primordial dwarf. In 2011, Lung Leg appeared in The Hagstone Demon, a film directed by Jon Springer.

In 2010, Lung Leg appeared in the documentary Blank City featuring interviews with participants in the no wave cinema and transgressive cinema movements.

There are few known interviews with her; one appeared in issue No. 12 of Film Threat magazine (1987), and another, by Duane Davis, appeared in the book, Deathtripping: The Cinema of Transgression (1995), edited by Jack Sargent. An excerpt of a now lost video interview of her appears in IDN4 (1991).

References

External links

Film Threat A synopsis of Film Threat issue No. 12, which featured the only known Lung Leg interview.
[https://www.youtube.com/watch?v=u4vxjbm_1aE Sewer Baby trailer on YouTube] – The official trailer for Mike Etoll's Sewer Baby, featuring Lung Leg.
Crepuscular Planet WCCO 4! – A goofy prank played live and on the air during a Minneapolis news broadcast in 2002, featuring Lung Leg, Mike Etoll and others.
You Killed Me First (Pt. 1) on YouTube
You Killed Me First (Pt. 2) on YouTube
Submit to Me on YouTube
I Was in a Richard Kern Movie on YouTube — Lung Leg and Cruella DeVille discuss their roles in Richard Kern's Super 8 films.

Living people
1963 births
Actresses from Minneapolis
21st-century American women